Libya is a country in the Maghreb region of North Africa, bordered by the Mediterranean Sea to the north, Egypt to the east, Sudan to the southeast, Chad and Niger to the south, and Algeria and Tunisia to the west. The Libyan economy depends primarily upon revenues from the oil sector, which accounts for 80% of GDP and 97% of exports. Libya holds the largest proven oil reserves in Africa and is an important contributor to the global supply of light, sweet crude. Apart from petroleum, the other natural resources are natural gas and gypsum.

Notable firms 
This list includes notable companies with primary headquarters located in the country. The industry and sector follow the Industry Classification Benchmark taxonomy. Organizations which have ceased operations are included and noted as defunct.

See also 
 List of airlines of Libya
 List of banks in Libya

References 

Libya